Edward Rose Tunno (1794–1863) was a Member of the Parliament of the United Kingdom for Bossiney, Cornwall, 1826–1832.

He had homes at Llangennech, near Llanelli, Carmarthenshire, Wales; Boverton Castle, Llantwit Major, Glamorganshire, Wales; and 19 Upper Brook Street, London, England. In 1825 he married Caroline Raikes, but they had no children.

His father was John Tunno (1746–1819), a Scottish-born merchant and slave trader who had made a fortune in Charleston, South Carolina and, after the American Revolution, another in London as a member of Lloyd's of London and a friend of Sir Thomas Baring. His mother was Margaret Rose of Charleston, who married John Tunno in 1781. She was the daughter of John Rose, another Scot descended from the Roses of Clava, in Nairnshire, who had 42,000 acres of rice plantations in South Carolina and interests in Jamaica.

Because of his role as executor of his father-in-law's John Rose's plantation interests in Jamaica, he is listed as a claimant for compensation after the passing of the Slavery Abolition Act 1833.

His coalmine at Llangennech was worked by James Shears from 1824.

He was the uncle of the MP Edward John Sartoris (1814–88), to whom he bequeathed much of his estate.

References

1794 births
1863 deaths
People from Llanelli
People from Glamorgan
People from Middlesex
Members of the Parliament of the United Kingdom for constituencies in Cornwall
UK MPs 1826–1830
UK MPs 1830–1831
UK MPs 1831–1832